The 5th annual Canadian Screen Awards were held on March 12, 2017, to honour achievements in Canadian film, television, and digital media production in 2016. Nominations were announced on January 17, 2017.

Awards in many of the technical categories were presented in a series of galas, collectively called Canadian Screen Week, in the days leading up to the main ceremony. At the main ceremony, the film It's Only the End of the World and the television series Orphan Black won the most awards in film and television categories, with six and nine awards, respectively.

Broadcast
The ceremony was hosted by Howie Mandel. His performance was not well received by critics; Kate Taylor of The Globe and Mail criticized Mandel's recurring joke of dubbing the awards the STDs – for "Screen, television, Digital" – in response to the fact that the awards still do not have an official short-form name in the manner of "Oscar" for the Academy Awards, while Norman Wilner of NOW criticized Mandel's "hacky crowd work and even hackier bits", concluding that "I'm sure this stuff kills at Casino Rama, but when you're supposed to be anchoring an awards show it just seems cheap and lazy."

Both critics wrote that the broadcast's best moments came from various winners' moving and funny acceptance speeches, including Tatiana Maslany's emotional response to winning the award for Best Actress in a Film for The Other Half; Paul Sun-Hyung Lee's moving speech about how honoured he was to win Best Actor in a Comedy Series for Kim's Convenience, a series which celebrated the immigrant contribution to Canadian society; Christopher Plummer's grace and humility in accepting a lifetime achievement award; and Catherine O'Hara's decision to accept her award for Best Actress in a Comedy Series in character as Moira Rose from Schitt's Creek.

At the broadcast, George Stroumboulopoulos announced that beginning in 2018, the academy's annual award for Science or Nature Documentary Program would be named the Rob Stewart Award in memory of documentary filmmaker Rob Stewart, who died in January 2017.

Film

Television

Programs

Actors

News and information

Sports

Craft awards

Directing

Music

Writing

Digital media

Multiple nominations and awards

Special awards
Several special awards were given:
board of directors' Tribute: Helga Stephenson
Earle Grey Award: Tantoo Cardinal
Fan Choice Award: Natasha Negovanlis
Gordon Sinclair Award: Simcha Jacobovici
Icon Award: Just for Laughs
Lifetime Achievement Award: Christopher Plummer

References

External links
Canadian Screen Awards, 2017 nominees

05
2016 film awards
2016 television awards
2017 in Toronto
2017 in Canadian cinema
2017 in Canadian television
2016 awards in Canada